Matias del Campo is a Chilean born Austrian architect, designer and educator, co-founder of the architectural practice SPAN.

Education and early career
Matias del Campo graduated from the University of Applied Arts Vienna in 2003, receiving a Master of Architecture with distinction.
 
His ideology is a reflexion of the explorations he manifests towards contemporary tendencies, representing an alloy between “materialization protocols in nature, cutting-edge technologies and philosophical inquiry which together form a comprehensive design ecology”.

During his tenure within the Hans Hollein studio at University of Applied Arts Vienna, he was first introduced to Computational Design, being one of the students chosen by Hollein to learn programming in UNIX and test 3D modeling packages.

SPAN
In 2003, alongside architect Sandra Manninger, he started the architectural practice SPAN, a bureau with offices in Vienna and Shanghai, and one of the first offices to focus on computational design in Vienna. The practice is currently developing projects in Jakarta, Malaysia, Wuhan, Chengdu, Guangzhou and Shanghai, China.

Initially, the practice started gaining a reputation in Vienna for its radically advanced projects, becoming supported by the Architecture Centre Vienna, which showcased their work and commissioned the bureau with exhibition designs and for the remodeling of the center's headquarters, and won an award from the Austrian Experimental Architecture awards. The studio thinks of architecture as a process.

SPAN started gaining international recognition in 2010, when the architects won the competition for the Austrian Pavilion within the Shanghai World Expo, as well as the newest Brancusi Museum in Paris, France. In 2011, Museum of Applied Arts, Vienna invited SPAN to conduct a solo show in their gallery, other architecture practices invited to the exhibition series include Greg Lynn, Asymptote, FOA, and Lebbeus Woods.

Now a widely, internationally recognized practice, SPAN's work was featured at the 2012 Venice Architecture Biennale, at ArchiLab 2013 at the FRAC Centre, Orléans, France, the 2008 and 2010 Architecture Biennale in Beijing, and in the 2011 solo show ‘Formations’ at the Museum of Applied Arts, Vienna. Most recently, SPAN's work was highlighted in a solo exhibit at the Fab Union Gallery in Shanghai China.

The practice is known for actively practicing in building design and at the same time elaborating the theoretical and discoursive base for novel developments. All projects are conceptualized as vehicles of exploration.

Teaching

Matias del Campo currently teaches as an Associate Professor of Architecture within the Taubman College of Architecture and Urban Planning at the University of Michigan. He has also been a Lecturer within the University of Pennsylvania, Penn Design Philadelphia, and a Guest Professor at the Dessau Institute of Architecture, Germany.

Research, writing and lectures
In 2015, Matias del Campo received the Accelerate@CERN fellowship Award Research award, courtesy of the Swiss CERN Institute, a one-month artist residency within CERN, aimed to artists which are spending for the first time within a science laboratory. Together with Sandra Manninger, the two architects spent the month of May 2016 within the Institute, their research being true to that of SPAN philosophy, aiming to “go beyond beautiful data to discover something that could be defined voluptuous data. This coagulation of numbers, algorithms, procedures and programs uses the forces of thriving nature and, passing through the calculation of a multi-core processor, knits them with human desire.”

Matias del Campo has been a guest editor for Next Generation Building, by TU Delft, in March 2016, and in November 2016 for the AD Magazine in London, UK.

His newest book premiered on the 22nd of March 2017, entitled Sublime Bodies, Architectural Problems in the Postdigital Age, published by Tokyo University Press, Shanghai, and is featured both in Chinese and English.

He has contributed to many publications in the field of Computational Design, such as Marjan Colletti's Digital Poetics (Ashgate 2013) or Mark Burry's Scripting Culture: Architectural Design and Programming  (Wiley 2011).

In 2016, del Campo was Technical Chair of the ACADIA conference Material Frontiers 2 - Synthetic Biologies, curating and moderating the discussion. He has lectured worldwide, within institutions such as IAAC, in January 2017, RMIT Australia in 2015, The Tokyo University in July 2015, La Sapienza Rome in February 2015, University of Applied Arts Vienna, UCLA, TU Innsbruck in 2012 or Hyperbody Studio TU Delft, Netherlands in 2008.

References 

Living people
University of Applied Arts Vienna alumni
Austrian architects
University of Michigan faculty
Year of birth missing (living people)